Virgin of the Secret Service is a British television series which ran for one season in 1968, produced by the ITV  franchise, Associated Television. The series was created by Ted Willis.

The show was a tongue-in-cheek adventure series set in the early 1900s, and followed the adventures of Captain Robert Virgin (Clinton Greyn), a gentleman officer working for the British Secret Service. Each episode would see him dispatched to different parts of the world by Colonel Shaw-Camberley (Noel Coleman) to do battle with enemies of the British Empire. He was aided by his escapologist batman Sergeant Doublett (John Cater) and Mrs. Cortez (Veronica Strong), an emancipated female photographer and part-time secret agent. Virgin's principal adversary was always Karl Von Brauner (Alexander Doré) – a German spy who would always be dreaming up "a plan of the utmost simplicity" with which to take down the Empire and the Secret Service.

The series was released on DVD by Network on 1 April 2013.

Recurring Cast
Captain Robert Virgin - Clinton Greyn
Mrs. Virginia Cortez - Veronica Strong
Sergeant Fred Doublett - John Cater
Karl Von Brauner - Alexander Doré
Colonel Shaw-Camberley - Noel Coleman
Klaus Striebeck - Peter Swanwick

Episode list

References

External links 
 

1960s British drama television series
ITV television dramas
Television shows produced by Associated Television (ATV)
English-language television shows